or  (plural varies: , , or ) are spirits or an object that a spirit inhabits. It is frequently applied to a variety of objects used throughout the Congo Basin in Central Africa, especially in the Territory of Cabinda that are believed to contain spiritual powers or spirits. The term and its concept have passed with the Atlantic slave trade to the Americas.

Meaning
The current meaning of the term derives from the root , referring to a spiritual entity or material objects in which it is manifested or inhabits in Proto-Njila, an ancient subdivision of the Bantu language family.<ref>Jan Vansina, Paths in the Rainforest:  Toward a History of Political Tradition in Equatorial Africa (Madison:  University of Wisconsin Press, 1990), p. 146 and 297; but see also Vansina's corrective statements in How Societies Are Born:   Governance in West Central Africa Before 1600 (Charlottesville, VA and London:  University of Virginia Press, 2004), pp. 51-52.</ref>

It was reported by Dutch visitors to Loango, current territory of Cabinda, in the 1668 book Description of Africa as referring both to a material item and the spiritual entity that inhabits it. In the sixteenth century, when the Kingdom of Kongo was converted to Christianity,  (a substance having characteristics of ) was used to translate holy in the Kikongo Catechism of 1624.

In the eighteenth century, the mu- prefix evolved into a simple nasal n-, so the modern spelling is properly , but many orthographies spell it  (there is no language-wide accepted orthography of Kikongo).

Use
Close communication with ancestors and belief in the efficacy of their powers are closely associated with minkisi in Kongo tradition. Among the peoples of the Congo Basin, especially the Bakongo and the Songye people of Kasai, exceptional human powers are frequently believed to result from some sort of communication with the dead. People known as banganga (singular: nganga) work as healers, diviners, and mediators who defend the living against black magic (witchcraft) and provide them with remedies against diseases resulting either from witchcraft or the demands of bakisi (spirits), emissaries from the land of the dead.

In fact,  have even been described as portable graves, and many include earth or relics from the grave of a powerful individual as a prime ingredient. The metal objects commonly pounded into the surface of the power figures represent the s' active roles during ritual or ceremony. Each nail or metal piece represents a vow, a signed treaty, and efforts to abolish evil. Ultimately, these figures most commonly represent reflections upon socially unacceptable behaviors and efforts to correct them.

However, their operation is not primarily pharmaceutical, as they are not applied to or ingested by those who are sick, and perhaps  is more accurately translated as 'therapeutic substances'. Rather they are frequently chosen for metaphoric reasons, for example, bird claws in order to catch wrongdoers or because their names resemble characteristics of spirits in question.

Minerals were collected from various places associated with the dead, such as earth collected from graves and riverbeds. White clay was also very important in the composition of  due to the symbolic relationship of the color white and the physical aspects of dead skin as well as their moral rightness and spiritual positivity. White contrasted with black, the color of negativity. Some  use red ochre as a coloring agent. The use of red is symbolic of the mediation of the powers of the dead.

 serve many purposes. Some are used in divination practices, rituals to eradicate evil or punish wrong-doers, and ceremonies for protective installments. Many are also used for healing, while others provide success in hunting or trade, among other things. Important  are often credited with powers in multiple domains. Most famously,  may also take the form of anthropomorphic or zoomorphic wooden carvings.

Types

 and the afflictions associated with them are generally classified into two types; the "of the above" and the "of the below". The above  are associated with the sky, rain, and thunderstorms. The below  are associated with the earth and waters on land. The above  were considered masculine and were closely tied to violence and violent forces. The  of the above were largely used to maintain order, serve justice, and seal treaties.

They also affected the upper body. Head, neck, and chest pains were said to be caused by these  figures. Some figures were in the form of animals. Most often these were dogs. Dogs are closely tied to the spiritual world in Kongo mythology. They live in two separate worlds; the village of the living, and the forest of the dead.  figures were often portrayed as having two heads – this was symbolic of their ability to see both worlds.

Nkondi

Nkondi (plural forms) are a subclass of minkisi that are considered aggressive. Because many of the  collected in the nineteenth century were activated by having nails driven into them, they were often called "nail fetishes" in travel writing, museum catalogs, and art history literature. Many  also feature reflective surfaces, such as mirrors, on their stomach areas or the eyes, which are held to be the means of vision in the spirit world. Although they can be made in many forms, the ones featuring a human statue with nails are the best described in anthropological and scholarly literature.

 are invoked to search out wrongdoing, enforce oaths, and cause or cure sicknesses. Perhaps the most common use was the locating and punishing of criminals, by hunting down wrongdoers and to avenging their crimes.  An oath taker may declare him or herself vulnerable to the disease caused by an  should he or she violate the oath. People who fall sick with diseases known to be associated with a particular  may need to consult the  responsible for mediating with that spirit to determine how to be cured.

Although  have probably been made since at least the sixteenth century, the specifically nailed figures, which have been the object of collection in Western museums, nailed  were probably made primarily in the northern part of the Kongo cultural zone in the nineteenth and early twentieth centuries.

Modern impact

The  figures brought back to Europe in the nineteenth century caused great interest in stimulating emerging trends in modern art and Bantu themes previously considered primitive or gruesome were now viewed as aesthetically interesting. The pieces became influential in art circles and many were acquired by art museums. The intentions of the  who created  were practical; that is, their characteristics were dictated by the need of the object to do the work it was required to do. Hence the nails which caused a sensation were never seen as decorative items but as a requirement of awakening the spirit or the gestures were part of a substantial metaphor of gestures found in Kongo culture.

The Republic of the Congo artist Trigo Piula painted several items in a "New Fetish" series, due to the rebuffing of traditional fetishes by people. It "is a way of engaging with my community and a way of denouncing things that I believe are impacting us, like television for example", he said.

Gallery

See also
 Kongo mythology

References

Bibliography
Bassani, Ezio (1977).  "Kongo Nail Fetishes from the Chiloango River Area," African Arts 10: 36-40
Doutreloux, A. (1961).  "Magie Yombe," Zaire 15: 45-57.
Dupré, Marie-Claude (1975). "Les système des forces nkisi chez le Kongo d'après le troisième volume de K. Laman,"  Africa 45: 12-28.
Janzen, John and Wyatt MacGaffey (1974). An Anthology of Kongo Religion Lawrence, KS:  University of Kansas Press.
Laman, Karl (1953–68).  The Kongo 4 volumes, Uppsala:  Studia Ethnografica Uppsaliensia.
Lecomte Alain. Raoul Lehuard.  Arts, Magie te Médecine en Afrique noire. Edition A. Lecomte. 2008
Lehuard, Raoul. (1980). Fétiches à clou a Bas-Zaire. Arnouville.
MacGaffey, Wyatt, and John Janzen (1974).  "Nkisi Figures of the BaKongo," African Arts 7: 87-89.
MacGaffey, Wyatt (1977).  "Fetishism Revisted:  Kongo nkisi in Sociological Perspective." Africa 47: 140-152.
MacGaffey, Wyatt (1988).  "Complexity, Astonishment and Power:  The Visual Vocabulary of Kongo Minkisi" Journal of Southern African Studies14:  188-204.
MacGaffey, Wyatt, ed. and transl. (1991), Art and Healing of the Bakongo Commented Upon by Themselves Bloomington, IN:  Indiana University Press.
MacGaffey, Wyatt. "The Eyes of Understanding:  Kongo Minkisi," in Wyatt MacGaffey and M. Harris, eds, Astonishment and Power  Washington, DC:  Smithsonian Institution Press, pp. 21–103.
MacGaffey, Wyatt (1998). "'Magic, or as we usually say 'Art': A Framework for Comparing African and European Art," in Enid Schildkrout and Curtis Keim, eds. The Scramble for Art in Central Africa. Cambridge and New York: Cambridge University Press, pp. 217–235.
MacGaffey, Wyatt (2000).  Religion and Society in Central Africa:  The BaKongo of Lower Zaire Chicago:  University of Chicago Press.
MacGaffey, Wyatt (2000).  Kongo Political Culture:  The Conceptual Challenge of the Particular. Bloomington:  Indiana University Press.
Vanhee, Hein (2000). "Agents of Order and Disorder:  Kongo Minkisi," in Karel Arnaut, ed. Revisions:  New Perspectives on African Collections of the Horniman Museum. London and Coimbra, pp. 89–106.
Van Wing, Joseph (1959).  Etudes Bakongo Brussels: Descleė de Brouwer.
Volavkova, Zdenka (1972).  "Nkisi Figures of the Lower Congo" African Arts'' 5:  52-89.

African art
Afro-American religion
Kongo culture
Magic (supernatural)
Religious objects
Traditional African medicine